The church of the Holy Savior of Valdediós  is a Roman Catholic pre-romanesque church, located next to Villaviciosa, Asturias, Spain.

The church stands in the Boides valley (Villaviciosa), the place where Alfonso III of Asturias was detained when he was dispossessed by his sons, and where there used to be an old convent governed by the Benedictine Order, substituted in the 13th century by the Cistercians. The church known as the "Bishops' Chapel" was consecrated on 16 September 893, with seven bishops in attendance.

The church is next to the Monasterio de Santa María de Valdediós.

Architecture 

The church stands on a classic basilica ground plan with a triple sanctuary, separating the central nave from the side aisles with four semicircular arches. At the western end, there are three enclosures, the central one used as an access vestibule, and two located on the left and right which may have been used to house pilgrims. The vault over the central nave, like the one over the apses, is barreled with a brick ceiling and decorated with al fresco wall painting, alternating a variety of geometric designs.

Royal tribune
The royal tribune is located above the vestibule, separate from the area intended for the congregation (spatium fidelium) in the central nave, and this from the area devoted to the liturgy by iron grilles, now disappeared. Particular elements of this church include the covered gallery annexed to the southern facade at a later date or Royal Portico, the 50 cm square columns on the central naves arches, the triple-arched window open in the central apse, and the room above it, exclusively accessed from the exterior by a window which here has two openings, compared with the habitual three.

See also 
Asturian art
Catholic Church in Spain

Notes

References 

 
 

893
9th-century churches in Spain
Salvador de Valdedios
Pre-Romanesque architecture in Asturias
9th-century establishments in Spain
Bien de Interés Cultural landmarks in Asturias